The Gilberton Catamounts, sometimes called the Gilberton Cadamounts and the Gilberton Duck Streeters, were a 1920s-era professional football team based in Gilberton, Pennsylvania. However, the team played many of its home games in nearby Mahanoy City because Gilberton's home field, Stoddard Field, was usually flooded. The borough got its "Ducktown" nickname mainly because of persistent flooding.

Big money
The team played independently against other teams from Pennsylvania's "coal country". During the 1920s the teams based here paid large amounts of money to talented pro football players. Many players from the National Football League came to play football in this region because of the amount of money paid out. In 1924 Gilberton, under the managership of Joe Keating and James Rafferty, Gilberton acquired three new star players just days before their season opener. The team signed Ben Shaw, Cecil Grigg, and Lou Smyth. All three players were members of the Canton Bulldogs of the NFL. Ironically in 1924 the team played in the Anthracite League, which was formed to combat the out-of-control hiring of top professional football talent. It is no wonder that league folded after the 1924 season. The team later played in the Eastern League of Professional Football from 1926 until the league folded in 1927.

Fritz Pollard
Pro Football Hall of Famer Fritz Pollard played with the team in 1923 and 1924.  Coach Charlie Copley, a former teammate of Pollard's with the Akron Pros and the Milwaukee Badgers, recruited Pollard to play for the Catamounts.  He became the first African-American to play football in the coal region.

Hall of Famers

References

Notes

Defunct American football teams in Pennsylvania
History of Pennsylvania
Anthracite League teams
Schuylkill County, Pennsylvania
1920s establishments in Pennsylvania
1920s disestablishments in Pennsylvania
Sports clubs established in the 1920s